Antoinette Quinche (1896–1979) was a Swiss feminist and politician (Free Democratic Party of Switzerland). She was president of the Schweizerische Aktionskomitee für Frauenstimmrecht (The Swiss women suffrage union) from 1932 to 1959.

Biography
Quinche was born in Diesse, Switzerland on 25 February 1896. First woman to enter the Gymnase de la Cité à Lausanne. She went on to study law and become a lawyer.  In 1952, she and 1,414 other disputants from her community demanded to be entered into the voters' register. With the argument that the cantonal constitution at that time did not explicitly exclude women's voting rights, they went with their demand before the Federal Court. Again as in 1923, they were rejected by reference to Gewohnheitsrecht (customary law).

Quinche died in Lausanne, Switzerland on 13 May 1979.

References

Regula Ludi: Quinche, Antoinette im Historischen Lexikon der Schweiz, 2011
Gazette de Lausanne, 19. Mai 1979
Pionnières et créatrices en Suisse romande, 2004, S. 312-318

See also 
 First women lawyers around the world

1896 births
1979 deaths
Swiss suffragists
Swiss feminists
Free Democratic Party of Switzerland politicians